The 2018–19 Novo Basquete Brasil (NBB) season is the 11th season of this top-tier level Brazilian professional basketball league. This tournament is organized by the Liga Nacional de Basquete (LNB). The NBB will also qualify teams for international tournaments such as the FIBA South American League (LSB) and FIBA Americas League.

In this season, fourteen teams will play during the regular season. At the end of the season's home and away games, the top four league teams qualify for the quarterfinal playoffs, while the teams finishing in the 5th through 12th places will participate in playoffs to determine the other four teams in the quarterfinals. The quarterfinals are played in a best out of five series since the NBB 2015–16 season.

For this season, the last regular season placed team is relegated to the 2020 Liga Ouro, the NBB's second tier division. Also, only the 2019 Liga Ouro winner receives the right to play in the NBB 2019–20 season.

Broadcasting rights 
For the first time since its inception in 2009, the NBB will have 4 TV broadcasting partners, along with live game transmissions at the official competition pages on Facebook and Twitter. 

The league's weekly broadcasting calendar runs as follows:

Monday: 1 live game on Facebook
Tuesday: 1 or 2 live games on ESPN Brasil
Wednesday: 1 live game on Twitter
Thursday: 1 live game on Band Sports
Friday: 1 live game on Fox Sports
Saturday: 1 or 2 live games on Band plus extra night games on other channels

Participating teams 
New teams in the league
Corinthians (2018 Liga Ouro champions, promoted) 
São José (2018 Liga Ouro runners-up, invited)

Teams that were relegated last season
Campo Mourão
Liga Sorocabana

Teams that left the league
Caxias do Sul

Team relocation
Universo/Vitória moved from Salvador, to the capital Brasília, after the end of the previous season. Universo/Vitória, despite being located in the same city, playing in the same arena, and having the same investors, is not the same Brasília team that won the NBB championship three times in the past. That franchise ended after the 2016–17 NBB season.

{| class="wikitable sortable"
! Team
! Home city
! Stadium
! Capacity
! Head coach
! Appearance
! Last regular season
! Last season playoffs
! NBB Titles (Last title)
|-
| Basquete Cearense
| Fortaleza
| Ginásio Paulo Sarasate
| 8,200
|  Dannyel Russo
| style="text-align: center;"| 7th
| style="text-align: center;"| 10th
| style="text-align: center;"| Quarterfinals
| style="text-align: center;"| 0
|-
| Sendi/Bauru Basket
| Bauru
| Ginásio Panela de Pressão
| 2,000
|  Demétrius Ferracciú
| style="text-align: center;"| 11th
| style="text-align: center;"| 6th
| style="text-align: center;"| Semifinals
| style="text-align: center;"| 1 (2016–17)
|-
| Botafogo
| Rio de Janeiro
| Ginásio Oscar Zelaya
| 850
|  Leonardo Alves
| style="text-align: center;"| 2nd
| style="text-align: center;"| 12th
| style="text-align: center;"| Play-off First Round
| style="text-align: center;"| 0
|-
| Corinthians
| São Paulo
| Ginásio Wlamir Marques
| 7,000
|  Bruno Savignani
| style="text-align: center;"| 1st
| style="text-align: center;"| 1st (Liga Ouro)
| style="text-align: center;"| DNP
| style="text-align: center;"| 0
|-
| Flamengo
| Rio de Janeiro
| Arena Carioca 1
| 6,000
|  Gustavo de Conti
| style="text-align: center;"| 11th
| style="text-align: center;"| 1st
| style="text-align: center;"| Semifinals
| style="text-align: center;"| 5 (2015–16)
|-
| Sesi/Franca
| Franca
| Ginásio Pedrocão
| 6,000
|  Helinho
| style="text-align: center;"| 11th
| style="text-align: center;"| 3rd
| style="text-align: center;"| Quarterfinals
| style="text-align: center;"| 0
|-
| Joinville/AABJ
| Joinville
| Centreventos Cau Hansen
| 4,000
|  George Rodrigues
| style="text-align: center;"| 2nd
| style="text-align: center;"| 13th
| style="text-align: center;"| DNQ
| style="text-align: center;"| 0
|-
| Minas Storm
| Belo Horizonte
| Juscelino Kubitschek Arena
| 4,000
|  Espiga
| style="text-align: center;"| 11th
| style="text-align: center;"| 9th
| style="text-align: center;"| Quarterfinals
| style="text-align: center;"| 0
|-
| Mogi das Cruzes/Helbor
| Mogi das Cruzes
| Ginásio Municipal Professor Hugo Ramos
| 5,000
|  Guerrinha
| style="text-align: center;"| 7th
| style="text-align: center;"| 4th
| style="text-align: center;"| Runner-up
| style="text-align: center;"| 0
|-
| Paulistano
| São Paulo
| Ginásio Antônio Prado Junior
| 1,500
|  Régis Marelli
| style="text-align: center;"| 11th
| style="text-align: center;"| 2nd
| style="text-align: center;"| Champions
| style="text-align: center;"| 1 (2017–18)
|-
| Pinheiros
| São Paulo
| Poliesportivo Henrique Villaboim
| 854
|  César Guidetti
| style="text-align: center;"| 11th
| style="text-align: center;"| 7th
| style="text-align: center;"| Play-off First Round
| style="text-align: center;"| 0
|-
| São José
| São José dos Campos
| Lineu Moura
| 2,260
|  Cristiano Ahmed
| style="text-align: center;"| 9th
| style="text-align: center;"| 2nd (Liga Ouro)
| style="text-align: center;"| DNP
| style="text-align: center;"| 0
|-
| Universo/Caixa/Brasília
| Brasília
| Ginásio Nilson Nelson
| 16,000
|  André Germano
| style="text-align: center;"| 9th
| style="text-align: center;"| 8th
| style="text-align: center;"| Play-off First Round
| style="text-align: center;"| 0
|-
| Vasco da Gama
| Rio de Janeiro
| Ginásio Vasco da Gama
| 1,000
|  Alberto Bial
| style="text-align: center;"| 3rd
| style="text-align: center;"| 11th
| style="text-align: center;"| Play-off First Round
| style="text-align: center;"| 0
|-
|}

Transactions

Retirement
On May 12, 2018, following Flamengo's elimination in the 2017–18 NBB season semifinals, Marcelinho Machado retired from basketball after playing 22 seasons, 12 for Flamengo. Along with teammates Marquinhos and Olivinha, Marcelinho is the player with the most team success in the NBB, having reached the league's final on six occasions. He clinched the title in the 2008–09, 2012–13, 2013–14, 2014–15, and 2015–16 seasons, as well as winning the 2004–05 and 2007–08 CBB titles, the precursor of the NBB. He was also runner-up in the 2009–10 NBB season.

In his career, Marcelinho also won the FIBA South American Basketball League, the FIBA Americas League, and the FIBA Intercontinental Cup, all while playing with Flamengo.

Coaching changes

Regular season
The regular season began on Saturday, October 13, 2018 13:35 UTC−03:00 at Ginásio Antônio Prado Junior, home of Club Athletico Paulistano, who was defeated 75–85 by Mogi das Cruzes/Helbor. The regular season is scheduled to end on Tuesday, March 26, 2019.

Standings

The standings are updated according to the LNB official website table.

Results

Super 8 Cup 
A new competition on the NBB calendar, the Super 8 Cup consists of a series of single elimination games, played between the top 8 clubs of the regular season during the holiday break. The winner will qualify to the 2019 Americas League, to be played in October 2019.

Playoffs

Awards

Team of the Week

bold player indicate best player of the week

Season awards

Statistical leaders

Individual tournament highs

Points

Rebounds

Assists

Blocks

Steals

Efficiency

References

External links
Official website 
New Basketball Brazil at Latinbasket.com

2018-19
NBB
Brazil